The Ultimate Collection is a compilation album by Welsh mezzo-soprano Katherine Jenkins, released in 2009.

Track listing

Certifications

References

2009 compilation albums
Katherine Jenkins albums
Decca Records compilation albums